HMS Marigold was a  of the Royal Navy. She was launched on 4 September 1940 and was sunk by an Italian air-dropped torpedo on 9 December 1942.

Design and construction
The Flower class arose as a result of the Royal Navy's realisation in the late 1930s that it had a shortage of escort vessels, particularly coastal escorts for use on the East coast of Britain, as the likelihood of war with Germany increased. To meet this urgent requirement, a design developed based on the whale-catcher  - this design was much more capable than naval trawlers, but cheaper and quicker to build than the s or s that were alternatives for the coastal escort role.

Displacement was about  standard and  full load.

Design armament was a single BL 4-inch Mk IX naval gun forward and a single 2-pounder "pom-pom" anti-aircraft cannon aft, although the pom-poms were not available until 1941, so early Flowers such as Marigold were completed with improvised close-range anti aircraft armament such as Lewis guns or Vickers .50 machine guns instead.

Marigold was one of 24 Flowers ordered by the British Admiralty on 31 August 1939 under the 1939/40 Naval estimates. She was laid down at Hall, Russell & Company's Aberdeen shipyard on 21 January 1940, was launched on 4 September 1940 and completed on 28 February 1941.

Service
Marigold served in a number of the theatres of the Second World War.

On 7 May 1941, Marigold, a member of the 7th Escort Group, was part of the escort for the westbound Atlantic convoy Convoy OB 318. U-94 torpedoed and sunk two merchant ships. Marigold picked up 19 survivors from one of the ships sunk in the attack, . The corvettes of the 7th Escort Group, including Marigold were relieved by ships from the 3rd Escort group on 8 May, allowing the 7th Escort Group ships to join the inbound Convoy HX 123.

Marigold remained part of the 7th Escort Group on 1 July 1941. From 18 August Marigold, now part of Escort Group 36, formed part of the escort of Convoy HG 71, bound for the UK from Gibraltar. While four Italian submarines were deployed against the convoy, none managed to find it, and HG 71 reached Liverpool unharmed on 1 September. On 12 September 1941, Marigold left Liverpool as part of the escort for the Gibraltar-bound convoy OG 74. Two merchant ships were sunk by the German submarine  on the night of 20/21 September, while the rescue ship  was badly damaged by a German Focke-Wulf Fw 200 Condor long-range bomber on 21 September and was scuttled by Marigold and the sloop . Marigold arrived in Gibraltar on 26 September. In total, six ships from OG 74 were sunk. Marigold remained part of the 36th Escort Group on 1 October 1941.

On 16 November 1941, Marigold set out from Gibraltar as part of Operation Chieftain, a diversion operation for Operation Crusader, the British offensive in the North African desert. The operation was a dummy convoy (with empty merchant ships) intended to attract attention of German and Italian air power away from the land battle. That night Marigold which had lost contact with the convoy because of engine trouble, and was trying to rejoin the convoy, was spotted by the  30 miles East of Europa Point and south of Málaga. U-433 misidentified the corvette for a cruiser and attacked with a spread of four torpedoes, all of which missed. An initial pattern of five depth charges was ineffective, but after 15 minutes, Marigold detected the submarine on sonar, and attacked with ten depth charges, causing the commander of U-433 to surface the submarine so that the crew could abandon ship. Marigold opened fire on the submarine when it surfaced and U-433 sank quickly. Marigold picked up 38 survivors, with six of U-433s crew killed. The First Sea Lord congratulated the Marigold and its commander, Lieutenant William MacDonald R.N.V.R., on this action.

On 14 December 1941, Marigold, now part of the 36th Escort Group, left Gibraltar as part of Convoy HG 76. The convoy came under sustained U-boat attack from 17 December, and on 19 December, Marigold carried out a depth charge attack on a U-boat, which although failing to sink the submarine, helped to drive the U-boat away from the convoy. In total, the escort carrier , the destroyer  and two merchant ships were sunk by German submarines, while the convoy's escort sank three U-boats.

On 9 June 1942, the 36th Escort Group, including Marigold, left Gibraltar escorting Convoy HG 84. On 15 June 1942 she picked up 41 survivors from the British merchant , 20 survivors from the Norwegian tanker  and 29 survivors from the British merchant  that had been torpedoed and sunk by   West of Corunna, Spain.

Sinking
On the afternoon of 9 December 1942 Marigold was escorting convoy MKS 3Y, off Algiers, Algeria when she came under attack by three Italian S.79 VTBs torpedo bombers of 254a Squadriglia (254th squadron) of 105º Gruppo AS (105th Torpedo group). Marigold was hit by a single torpedo and sank after about 9 minutes, with 40 of her crew killed.

References

External links
 HMS Marigold at Convoyweb.org.uk
 Official loss report

 

Flower-class corvettes of the Royal Navy
Ships sunk by Italian aircraft
1940 ships
Maritime incidents in December 1942
Ships built by Hall, Russell & Company
Corvettes sunk by aircraft